The Official Christian & Gospel Albums Chart is a music chart based on sales of albums of Contemporary Christian and gospel music in the UK. It is compiled weekly by the Official Charts Company (OCC), with each week's number one being announced on Mondays on their official website. The chart was launched on 11 March 2013 in partnership with Christian child development charity Compassion UK – the album at number one on the first chart was Zion by Hillsong United. The band's record label, Hillsong Music UK, remarked that they were "thrilled to be part of the launch of the first Official Christian & Gospel Albums Chart in the UK". The event launching the chart was hosted by David Grant, and featured Martin Smith of Delirious? and the London Community Gospel Choir. The previous year, 600 new Christian music albums had been released in the UK.

Number ones

Broadcast
The chart is aired on Christian radio stations Premier Christian Radio on Tuesday afternoons at 5pm, and on UCB UK on Thursday evenings at 10pm and Sunday evenings at 6pm.

See also
List of Billboard Top Christian Albums number ones of the 2010s

References

External links
Official Christian & Gospel Albums Chart Top 20 at the Official Charts Company

British Christian music
British record charts
Christian music albums
Christian music lists
Christian and Gospel Albums